The 2009–10 Minnesota Timberwolves season was the 21st season of the franchise in the National Basketball Association.

Key dates
 June 25 – The 2009 NBA draft took place in New York City.
 July 8 – The free agency period started.

Summary

NBA Draft 2009

The Timberwolves, thanks to various trades, had six picks in the 2009 draft. They had four first-round picks at the #5, #6, #18, and #28 slots, as well as the #45 and #47 picks in the second.

Their first pick was Spanish teenage point guard sensation Ricky Rubio, followed immediately by another point guard, Syracuse sophomore Jonny Flynn. At #18, they picked yet another point guard, North Carolina's Ty Lawson. Their final first-rounder was Lawson's backcourt mate, shooting guard Wayne Ellington.

In the second round, the Timberwolves selected a fourth point guard, Nick Calathes of Florida. The team's final selection was Henk Norel, a Dutch power forward who was Rubio's teammate at Spanish club power Joventut Badalona.

The glut of point guards was partially resolved when the Timberwolves traded the rights to Lawson to the Denver Nuggets and Calathes to the Dallas Mavericks. In any event, Calathes was not expected to join the NBA in the near future, as he has signed a multimillion-dollar contract with Panathinaikos, one of the strongest clubs in his ancestral home of Greece.

Draft picks

Roster

Pre-season

Regular season

Standings

Record vs. opponents

Player statistics

Regular season 

|-
| 
| style=| 82 || style=| 82 || 30.3 || .431 || .346 || .648 || 3.4 || 2.4 ||style=| 1.4 || .4 || 13.0
|-
| 
| 29 || 0 || 9.2 || .389 || .333 ||style=| .944 || 1.0 || .8 || .3 || .1 || 1.7
|-
| 
| 76 || 1 || 18.2 || .424 || style=| .395 || .871 || 2.1 || 1.0 || .3 || .1 || 6.6
|-
| 
| 81 || 81 || 28.9 || .417 || .358 || .826 || 2.4 ||style=| 4.4 || 1.0 || .0 || 13.5
|-
| 
| 76 || 64 || 29.1 || .447 || .372 || .825 || 4.6 || 1.6 || .8 || .2 || 10.9
|-
| 
| 1 || 0 || 5.0 || .000 || . || . || .0 || 1.0 || 1.0 || .0 || .0
|-
| 
| 73 || 27 || 16.8 || style=| .558 || .000 || .690 || 2.8 || .7 || .3 || .5 || 6.1
|-
| 
| 39 || 2 || 10.6 || .441 || .000 || .684 || 2.7 || .6 || .3 || .2 || 3.2
|-
| 
| 76 || 76 || style=| 32.4 || .498 || .000 || .680 || 9.3 || 1.8 || .8 || 1.3 ||style=| 17.1
|-
| 
| 60 || 22 || 28.6 || .450 || .330 || .815 ||style=| 11.0 || 2.3 || .7 || .4 || 14.0
|-
| 
| 24 || 18 || 25.6 || .492 || .000 || .536 || 5.5 || 1.8 || .8 ||style=| 1.4 || 8.3
|-
| 
| 71 || 0 || 12.4 || .363 || .297 || .385 || 1.6 || .8 || .3 || .1 || 3.7
|-
| 
| 44 || 5 || 10.2 || .410 || .269 || .906 || 2.8 || .3 || .2 || .3 || 4.5
|-
| 
| style=| 82 || 1 || 21.1 || .456 || .067 || .717 || 2.6 || 3.1 || .7 || .1 || 8.2
|-
| 
| 4 || 0 || 6.3 || .444 || . || . || .8 || .3 || .0 || .0 || 2.0
|-
| 
| 80 || 31 || 19.8 || .433 || .295 || .798 || 3.1 || 1.7 || .8 || .3 || 5.6
|}

References

External links
 2009–10 Minnesota Timberwolves season at ESPN
 2009–10 Minnesota Timberwolves season at Basketball Reference

Minnesota Timberwolves seasons
Minnesota
2009 in sports in Minnesota
2010 in sports in Minnesota